The Notorious Landlady is a 1962 American comedy mystery film starring Kim Novak, Jack Lemmon, and Fred Astaire. The film was directed by Richard Quine, with a script by Blake Edwards and Larry Gelbart.

Plot
When American diplomat William Gridley arrives in London, he rents the second floor of Carly Hardwicke's townhouse and promptly falls in love with his sexy new landlady. But Gridley isn't aware of what many people suspect—that Carly murdered her husband Miles. However, since there is no body, Carly cannot be prosecuted. A Scotland Yard inspector, Oliphant, visits the embassy and convinces Gridley to spy on her. However, that evening, a fire erupts as he and Carly grill steaks in her back yard. The fire makes Fleet Street headlines, and a scandal results. But since Carly is an American, she goes to the embassy to plead Gridley's case. She tells Gridley's boss, Franklyn Ambruster, that Gridley is a good man and not to transfer him out of the country. Ambruster is touched. He takes Carly to lunch, becomes smitten with her, and proclaims her innocence in the murder affair.

One evening, Miles turns up in the townhouse, alive and well. His uneasy reunion with Carly degenerates into violence, and when Miles approaches her with a gun, there is a struggle, and the gun goes off, killing him. The fatal report is heard by Gridley while on the phone with Inspector Oliphant. But at the coroner's inquest, Carly is cleared when a crippled neighbor's private nurse testifies that Miles assaulted Carly. After the inquest, the nurse attempts to blackmail Carly over a pawn ticket to a candelabra that Miles had stuffed with stolen jewels. Carly and Gridley try to retrieve the candelabra but find the pawnbroker murdered. Gridley and Carly then locate the nurse in a Penzance retirement community. They catch her in the act of pushing her elderly patient off a cliff to silence her. (It was, in fact, the elderly patient who witnessed Miles and Carly fighting, not the nurse.) Gridley and Carly save the elderly lady as Ambruster and Oliphant arrive by helicopter. The crooked nurse is arrested and led away in cuffs.

Cast

 Kim Novak as Carlyle 'Carly' Hardwicke
 Jack Lemmon as William 'Bill' Gridley
 Fred Astaire as Franklyn Ambruster
 Lionel Jeffries as Inspector Oliphant
 Estelle Winwood as Mrs Dunhill
 Maxwell Reed as Miles Hardwicke
 Philippa Bevans as Mrs Agatha Brown
 Doris Lloyd as Lady Fallott
 Henry Daniell as the Stranger
 Ronald Long as Coroner
 Richard Peel as Sergeant Dillings
 Dick Crockett as Detective Carstairs
 Ottola Nesmith as Flower Woman
 Bess Flowers as Courtroom Spectator
 Scott Davey as Henry
 Ross Brown as Boy
 Mary O'Brady as Mrs Oliphant

Notes
Lemmon and Novak had appeared together on screen twice previously, in Phffft! (1954) and in Bell, Book and Candle (1958). In both later films, Novak portrayed a landlady.

The song "A Foggy Day (in London Town)" by George and Ira Gershwin serves as the main theme for the movie and was introduced in the 1937 Fred Astaire film A Damsel in Distress.

Filming started 15 May 1961. The opening London scenes set in so-called 'Gray Square' were filmed on The Columbia Ranch (the original back-lot of Columbia Pictures Studios at Burbank, California), now the Warner Bros. Ranch. For the closing scenes set on the cliffs of Cornwall, the location used was Point Lobos Reserve State Park, Carmel.

The film was announced in December 1957 with Quine to direct, and Lemmon to star opposite Victoria Shaw.

Larry Gelbart was working at Columbia adapting the musical Fair Game into a film for William Holden that was going to be directed by Richard Quine. Quine enjoyed Gelbart's work on Fair Game and invited him to work on the script for The Notorious Landlady which had originally been done by Blake Edwards. Gelberg wrote a draft and says S. N. Behrman was brought on to rewrite him.

Novak was paid $600,000. It was her last performance for Columbia after eight years with the studio.

Nominations
 Nominated for Best Written American Comedy in 1963 at the WGA Awards.

See also
 List of American films of 1962

References

External links
 
 
 
 
 

1962 films
1960s comedy mystery films
American comedy mystery films
American black-and-white films
Columbia Pictures films
1960s English-language films
Films scored by George Duning
Films based on short fiction
Films based on works by Margery Sharp
Films directed by Richard Quine
Films set in London
Films with screenplays by Larry Gelbart
1962 comedy films
1960s American films